Nepal is a landlocked mountainous country where transportation is difficult due to the terrain.

Road
Road is the country's primary transport mode.

Highways
Total:  31393 km
Paved:   14102 km
Gravel:. 7881 km
Unpaved: 9410 km (2018 est.)

Rail

Nepal Government Railway operated a short narrow gauge railway from 1927 to 1965. Presently in 2022, there are two operational railway lines in the country, both of which connect Nepal with India: the Raxaul–Sirsiya and the Jainagar–Janakpur. The former is a  line from Raxaul, India to Sirsiya Inland Container Depot (or dry port) near Birgunj, Nepal, and is primarily used for freight transport. It allows container traffic to be imported to Nepal through the Sirsiya dry port container depot. The latter is a  line from Jaynagar, India to Janakpur, Nepal, and is used primarily for passenger transport.

Nepal and India had agreed to construct 8 different India–Nepal cross-border rail lines, this includes linking Raxaul with Kathmandu, during Prime Minister KP Oli's visit to India. A team of technical officers visited Kathmandu to study the proposed railway from Raxaul to Kathmandu and they have stated that a feasibility study of the project would begin. They have already identified Chobhar as the terminus of the 113 km-long line. 

China–Nepal railway is a planned line through Kathmandu, linking India with Lhasa in Tibet, has been proposed by the KP Oli government. In November 2017, Chinese media reported the arrival of a delegation of Chinese railway experts in Nepal. They discussed the possibility of a rail connection between China and Nepal. In August 2018, the two sides reached an agreement on construction details of the railway.

Air

There are 53 airports in Nepal as of 2020 out of which 34 are in operation. Tribhuvan International Airport in Kathmandu and Gautam Buddha International Airport in Lumbini  are the international airports and serve as the aviation hubs.

Airports with paved runways
Total: 9
Over 3,047 m: 1
1,524 to 2,437 m: 1
914 to 1,523 m: 7 (2002)

Airports with unpaved runways
Total: 36
1,524 to 2,437 m: 1
914 to 1,523 m: 7
Under 914 m: 28 (2002)

Water

Nepal is a landlocked country with no ocean borders.

Nepal's three dry ports are Birgunj, Biratnagar, and Bhairahawa.

References